"Death Dance" is the second single from American rock band Sevendust's eleventh studio album, Kill the Flaw. The single was released to digital music outlets on March 22, 2016. It peaked at number twenty-nine on the Billboard Mainstream Rock chart.

Charts

Personnel
Lajon Witherspoon - lead vocals
Clint Lowery - lead guitars, backing vocals
John Connolly - rhythm guitars, backing vocals
Vinnie Hornsby - bass guitar
Morgan Rose - drums, backing vocals

References

Sevendust songs
2016 singles
2015 songs
Songs written by Clint Lowery
Songs written by Morgan Rose
Songs written by John Connolly (musician)
Songs written by Lajon Witherspoon
Songs written by Vinnie Hornsby